Michael Adrian Paul Joyce (born 1 June 1963) is an English drummer. He is best known as the drummer for the Smiths, an English rock band formed in Manchester in 1982.

Life and career
Joyce was born in Manchester to Irish Catholic parents, and attended St Gregory's Grammar School in the city. While the Smiths provided Joyce with his first taste of success, he had previously drummed for Manchester band The Hoax and Northern Irish punk rock group Victim. Joyce was a member of The Smiths throughout the band's existence (1982–87). Immediately after the break-up of the band, Joyce and Smiths bassist Andy Rourke played with Sinéad O'Connor.

They, along with Craig Gannon, also provided the rhythm section for two singles by Smiths' singer Morrissey – "Interesting Drug" and "The Last of the Famous International Playboys" and their B-sides. Work with Suede, Buzzcocks, Public Image Limited, Julian Cope, P. P. Arnold and Pete Wylie followed throughout the 1990s. Joyce, Rourke, and Gannon reunited to work on a project with fellow Manchester musician Aziz Ibrahim (formerly of the Stone Roses and Simply Red), ex-Oasis guitarist Bonehead (as Moondog One), and Vinny Peculiar.

Lawsuits
In 1996, Joyce sued former Smiths' colleagues Johnny Marr and Morrissey for an equal share of performance and recording royalties. Joyce won the case and was awarded damages of around £1 million from Morrissey and Marr.

According to Morrissey, who unsuccessfully appealed Joyce's claims, Joyce first sued Morrissey and Marr in 1989 for 25% of the Smiths' recording royalties. In 1996, Joyce won the case "on the basis of the 1890 Partnership Act". The next year (1997), according to Morrissey, "Joyce was paid £215,000 from me, and £215,000 from Johnny Marr. In 2001, as a final payment of back royalties, Johnny Marr paid Joyce £260,000 plus 'costs'. At this time I [Morrissey] was in the US and was not served with court proceedings, so Joyce obtained a Default Judgment. He then put forward a claim from me for £688,000 —well above and beyond the amount Johnny Marr was ordered to pay. In my absence, the figure was not contested. Since 2001, and because of the Default Judgment against me, Joyce has taken out Third Party Orders against the following societies: my personal bank account in England, Smiths royalties from Warner Music, my personal PRS royalties, my personal PPL royalties, and he has attempted to seize UK concert fees from venue to venue. This money, to date, totals £700,000. This figure is in addition to the figures mentioned above." Morrissey went on to claim that "[the] Joyce action is continuous. Because of his Default Judgment he continues to take my royalties, and the royalties of others mentioned above, from Warner Music—consequently I have not received record royalties since 2001."

2007 onward
In July 2007, Joyce, along with former bandmate Andy Rourke, released Inside The Smiths, a DVD which chronicled their experiences of being in the band. In October 2007, Joyce toured the UK playing drums for Vinny Peculiar with Bonehead (Oasis) on bass guitar, and in 2008 ran a successful night at The Brickhouse in Manchester called "Alternative Therapy". In parallel to his music career, Joyce works as a DJ and broadcaster, including occasional appearances on BBC 6 Music. Joyce has hosted shows on  East Village Radio, an internet station.

Since October 2017, Joyce has hosted a weekly radio show on Manchester radio station XS Manchester. In October 2018, the show was nominated in the 'Best Specialist Music Show' category at the ARIAS 2018 radio awards.

Joyce is a patron of the Manchester-based charity Back on Track; as part of this role, Joyce ran a special cooking session with some of the charity's clients, during which they cooked vegetables from his allotment, and featured as a story on ITV Granada.

Personal life
Joyce married Christina Riley in 1994. The couple have three children.

He is a vegetarian.

Joyce is a Manchester City fan, and is sometimes interviewed at City Square before important home matches.

Discography

The Smiths

Morrissey
 Bona Drag (1990)

References

External links
 Official website
 Official The Smiths Website

1963 births
Living people
Buzzcocks members
English people of Irish descent
English rock drummers
Musicians from Manchester
British indie pop musicians
British indie rock musicians
British alternative rock musicians
People from Fallowfield
The Smiths members